George McGee (born October 7, 1935) is a former American football player who played with the Boston Patriots. He played college football at Southern University.

References

1935 births
Living people
American football tackles
Southern Jaguars football players
Boston Patriots players
Players of American football from Baton Rouge, Louisiana